Henry Martin may refer to:

Military and politics
 Sir Henry Martin, 1st Baronet (1733–1794), Royal Navy officer, MP for Southampton 1790–94
 Henry Martin (Kinsale MP) (1763–1839), UK MP for the Irish constituency of Kinsale 1806–1818
 Henry Byam Martin (1803–1865), Royal Navy officer and watercolour artist
 Henry Martin (socialist) (1864–1951), British socialist
 Henry Martin (general) (1888–1984), French military commander
 Henry Robert Charles Martin (1889–1942), British officer of arms
 Kalfie Martin (Henry James 1910–2000), South African military commander

Sports
 Sir Henry Martin, 2nd Baronet (1768–1842), MCC cricketer
 Henry Martin (footballer) (1891–1974), Sunderland and England footballer
 Henry Martin (racecar driver) (born 1965), race car driver from Argentina
 Henry Martin (soccer) (born 1997), American soccer player
 Henry Martín (born 1992), Mexican footballer

Other
 Henry Austin Martin (1824–1884), physician, vaccine pioneer
Henry Martin (priest) (1830–1903), Archdeacon of Lindisfarne
 Henry Martin (bishop) (1889–1971), Anglican bishop in Canada
 H. Newell Martin (1848–1896), British physiologist
 Henry Martin (murderer) (died 1866), British murderer
 Henry Martin (cartoonist) (1925–2020), American cartoonist
 "Henry Martin" (song), a traditional Scottish folk tune about a pirate
 Henry G. Martin (1952-2022), British filmmaker

See also
Henry Martyn (1781–1812), Anglican priest and missionary
Henry Martyn (cricketer) (1877–1928), English cricketer
Henry Martyn, a 1989 science fiction novel by L. Neil Smith

Harry Martin (disambiguation) 
Henri Martin (disambiguation)
Henry Marten (disambiguation)
Martinizing, named after the chemist Henry Martin

Martin, Henry